The 2015 Women's World Junior Team Squash Championships was held in Eindhoven, Netherlands. The event took place from 31 July to 4 August 2015.

Seeds

Group stage results

Pool A

Pool B

Pool C

Pool D

Finals

Draw

Results

Semi-finals

Final

Post-tournament team ranking

See also
2015 Women's World Junior Squash Championships
World Junior Squash Championships

References

External links 
World Junior Squash Championships 2015 Official Website
World Junior Squash Championships 2015 SquashInfo Page

W
Squash tournaments in the Netherlands
2015 in Dutch sport
2015 in women's squash
World Junior Squash Championships
International sports competitions hosted by the Netherlands